Richard Joseph Vincent Termini (born June 20, 1956, Brooklyn, New York) is an American educator, platinum record award winning musician, composer, film director, writer and photographer. As a musician Termini played synthesizers and keyboards on several recordings including Type O Negative: World Coming Down, Cyndi Lauper: platinum award winning album, She's So Unusual, Patty Smyth: Never Enough, The Fixx: Ink, Ellison Chase: Welcome to Tomorrow, Jing: Jing Machine and others. Termini also produced the Fallout single featuring future Type O Negative members Peter Steele and Josh Silver.

Career
He produced and composed music for John Turturro's Cannes Caméra d'Or-winning film Mac and contributed additional music to Turturro's Illuminata and appears in the film as a Romani guitarist. Termini also composed, performed and produced the music for the Zack Winestine film 'States of Control'.  Termini composed and performed music for Television including the animated Kids are Punny which included "Camel Dances" featuring the voice of Madonna.

Termini's published photographs include the band Carnivore's first album and several other iconic Carnivore photographs from that period. Termini worked for NewLook magazine in the 1980s and several of his photographs featuring CBGB and various artists are presented there.

Termini composed, produced and performed the music for many of Roman Paska's productions including The End of the World, Ghost Sonata, Moby Dick in Venice, Yerma and Arden/Ardennes (As You Like It).

Termini taught audio and recording arts in New York City's Center for the Media Arts, and was teacher and chairman at the Institute of Audio Research. He is the founder and former Director of Digital Media Arts (DMX) NYC.

In 2013 the short film The Door, written and directed by Termini won the Art of Brooklyn Film Festival Dark Side Award.

Termini continues to compose and perform today.

References

External links
 

1956 births
Living people
American people of Italian descent
American male singers
American cinematographers
American rock keyboardists
American film score composers
American male film score composers
Songwriters from New York (state)
American rock singers
American photographers
Singers from New York City
Musicians from Brooklyn
Educators from New York City
American male songwriters